Laslo Đere was the defending champion but chose not to defend his title.

Ulises Blanch won the title after defeating Gianluigi Quinzi 7–5, 6–2 in the final.

Seeds

Draw

Finals

Top half

Bottom half

References
Main Draw
Qualifying Draw

Internazionali di Tennis Città di Perugia - Singles
2018 Singles